The slaty-breasted tinamou or Boucard's tinamou (Crypturellus boucardi) is a type of tinamou commonly found in lowland moist forests of Mexico and Central America.

Taxonomy
All tinamou are from the family Tinamidae, and in the larger scheme are also ratites. Unlike other ratites, tinamous can fly, although in general, they are not strong fliers. All ratites evolved from prehistoric flying birds, and tinamous are the closest living relative of these birds.

The slaty-breasted tinamou has two sub-species: 
 C. b. boucardi (the nominate subspecies) ranges along the lowlands of the Gulf of Mexico and Caribbean coast in southeastern Mexico, Belize, Guatemala, and northwestern Honduras
 C. b. costaricensis ranges on the Caribbean slope in Honduras, Nicaragua, and northern Costa Rica

Philip Sclater identified the slaty-breasted tinamou from a specimen from Oaxaca, Mexico, in 1859.

Etymology
Crypturellus can be broken down into the following: kruptos meaning covered or hidden, oura meaning the tail and ellus meaning diminutive. Therefore, Crypturellus means the small covered tail. Finally, boucardi is the Latin form of Boucard to commemorate Adolphe Boucard.

Range and habitat

Range
It is commonly found in lowland moist forest in subtropical and tropical regions up to  altitude. This species ranges along the Gulf of Mexico coast from southern Mexico, from southern Veracruz and northern Oaxaca south, to northern Costa Rica. Mexico, Belize, Guatemala, Honduras, Nicaragua and Costa Rica.

Habitat
It prefers thick evergreen forests with thick undergrowth, but also can be found in thick forests with little undergrowth, secondary forests, and on regenerating plantations. It likes moist areas as well.

Description
Its back and head are black to chestnut in color, brown on its wings, slaty grey on its breast, white on its throat, grey-brown on remainder of its underparts with darker barring on flanks and undertail. The female has barring on its wings. Its legs are pink to bright red, and its bill is dark above and yellow below.

Behavior
It is a shy and difficult tinamou to be seen on the dark forest floors. Its call is a three-note call and lower than other tinamous. Its calls can be in long bouts, up to five hours at a time. This tinamou and the thicket tinamou will produce hybrids on occasion.

Feeding
Like other tinamous, it feeds on fruit and seeds and some invertebrates, in particular, ants and termites.

Reproduction
The slaty-breasted tinamou male attracts 2 to 4 females to lay in its nest on the ground and in thick vegetation or between the raised roots of a tree. The male incubates and raises the young. Females will mate with more than one male.

Conservation
It is hunted for food but its numbers seem to be consistent.

Footnotes

References

External links
Stamps (for Belize)
Slaty-breasted Tinamou photo gallery VIREO

Crypturellus
Birds of Central America
Birds of Belize
Birds of Costa Rica
Birds of Guatemala
Birds of Honduras
Birds of Mexico
Birds of Nicaragua
Birds of the Yucatán Peninsula
Birds described in 1859
Taxa named by Philip Sclater
Petén–Veracruz moist forests